Lemba is one of the 24 communes that are the administrative divisions of Kinshasa, the capital city of the Democratic Republic of the Congo.

Location 

It extends to the southwest from there to the southern tip of the campus of the University of Kinshasa. Its eastern border is the Matete River and its western one is roughly the Yolo River down to and going west and south along By-Pass Avenue and then Kimwenzo Road to and alongside the campus.

Lemba's neighboring communes going clockwise from the north are: Limete, Matete, Kisenso, Mont Ngafula, Makala, and Ngaba.

Government 

The administration of Lemba is led by an unelected government appointed burgomaster.  As of 2023 the burgomaster is Jean Serge Poba.  The reform of having burgomasters elected by communal councils awaits the inaugural election of these councils.

Electoral district  
With 206,900 on its voter rolls Lemba is an electoral district for both the election of an eleven-member communal council and that of two deputies of the Provincial Assembly of Kinshasa.  Both elections are by open list.  For the National Assembly Lemba is part of the Kinshasa III district (Mont Amba).

Nationwide communal council elections were scheduled for 22 September 2019 but did not take place.  In December of that year President Tshisekedi declared that these elections would be held sometime in 2020.

The Provincial Assembly election was held as part of the general elections on 30 December 2018.  Peter Kazadi Kankonde (UDPS/Tshisekedi) and Yvette Lubala Nazinda are the deputies representing Lemba in the new legislature.

Administrative divisions 
In 2014 Lemba was divided into the following 15 quarters:

However, Camp Kabila and Camp Bumba are respectively camps of the National Police and the
Armed Forces.

See also 
 List of burgomasters of Lemba, Kinshasa (in French)

References

Communes of Kinshasa
Mont Amba District